SmartLink is a RFID-enabled credit card-sized smartcard that is the primary fare payment method on the PATH transit system in Newark and Hudson County in New Jersey and Manhattan in New York City. It was designed to replace PATH's paper-based farecard, QuickCard, and there was plans to expand its usage throughout most transit agencies in the tri-state area. The SmartLink card has been available to the public since July 2, 2007. Although the MetroCard used on the Metropolitan Transportation Authority (MTA)'s transit system can also be used on the PATH, the reverse is not true for SmartLink, which cannot be used on the MTA's system.

Registration
All SmartLink cards are eligible for online registration. In order to register a card, one must simply go to PATH's registration page and complete a form detailing the card holder's name, the unique serial code of the SmartLink card, and address. An account holder's information can be accessed online or by calling the SmartLink hotline. Money from lost cards can be transferred to a replacement card if the customer has an account; however, all replacement cards carry a $5 fee.

Registration of the card also permits the holder to monitor its usage and to link the SmartLink card to a credit card in the automatic replenishment program. When the card balance drops to five trips (or five days, for riders with an unlimited pass), the SmartLink card is topped up using the credit card on the account. This program can be managed online, on the PATH website.

Sales
Pre-loaded SmartLink cards with 10 trips are available at all stations for $30.00 (10 trips at $2.50 each, plus a $5.00 card fee).  However, MetroCard Vending Machines (MVMs) at all PATH stations are able to refill the SmartLink cards to a monetary amount equal to 1, 2, 4, 10, 20 and 40 trips as well as the daily or 30 day unlimited passes.

$5.00 SmartLink Cards with no trips, ready for charging at any PATH MetroCard Vending Machine, are available from vending machines at 33rd Street, Hoboken, Journal Square, Exchange Place, Newport and World Trade Center.

Pre-loaded SmartLink Cards are available for $55.00 (20 trips at $2.50 each, plus a $5.00 card fee) at newsstands in PATH terminals (33rd Street, Hoboken, Journal Square, Newark, World Trade Center). Zero trip and 20 trip cards are also available for purchase online on the PATH website.

Fares
When buying a SmartLink card for the first time, an additional, one-time $5 fee is levied to offset the cost of producing the card. The cards can be refilled in specified numbers of trips or by adding unlimited passes. When refilling, the regular fare structure is used and the $5 card purchase fee is not imposed. As of November 1, 2019 the following fare structure is in effect:

The maximum number of trips that can be loaded on the card is 140. An unlimited pass can be loaded on top of a regular trip SmartLink card.  When that occurs, the individual rides will remain in the background of the card.  When the unlimited pass expires the individual trips will be available for use. 

†Discounted fares are offered to seniors 65 years or older. The disabled, military, and students are not included in PATH's reduced-fare program.

Testing and roll-out
The initial testing phase was delayed several times due to software problems. It was originally intended to start in August 2006, but was postponed to October 2006. Continuing problems moved the testing phase of Senior SmartCards to February 2007.

On July 2, 2007, the Port Authority of New York and New Jersey (PANYNJ) commenced the initial roll-out of the SmartLink card to the general public at the World Trade Center station. On July 23, 2007 the card was introduced at the 33rd Street station. On August 6, 2007 the card was introduced at the Hoboken station.

During the initial roll out, the cost of the card was $29 which included the 20 ride fare of $24 plus a $5 charge for the card. In February 2008 the cards were formally rolled out to the general public at all stations.  In the initial stage, the SmartLink card allowed riders to place the same value on it as if they were purchasing a QuickCard by using machines located in PATH stations.

SmartLink Gray

On October 24, 2008, the Port Authority announced that as of November 30, 2008, NJ Transit ticket machines on NJ Transit stations would no longer sell the QuickCard and as of December 31, 2008, NJ Transit ticket machines in PATH stations (Newark, Hoboken, Journal Square, Exchange Place, and Pavonia-Newport) would no longer sell the cards.  The machines at the 33rd Street, Grove Street and WTC stations were removed in 2008.

At the end of 2010, the QuickCard was discontinued and replaced with the SmartLink Gray card, a non-refillable, disposable version of the SmartLink card.  This card was sold at selected newsstand vendors and was available in 10, 20 and 40 trips (at the discounted price of $2.10 per trip).  Unlike the regular SmartLink cards, the SmartLink Gray cards had an expiration date.

In 2016, PATH announced that it would discontinue the sale of SmartLink Gray cards on January 31 in favor of passengers using the refillable, plastic SmartLink card.  A short term exchange program was offered until February 2016 to allow passengers to swap their paper card for the plastic card without having to pay the $5.00 fee for the plastic card.

Expansion
The Port Authority, part of several transit systems in the New York-New Jersey region, is hoping that one day there will be a universal fare card for the region's transportation. However, estimates for expanding the SmartLink card to the New York City Subway and MTA buses may cost as high as $300 million. Estimates for adding New Jersey Transit would cost an additional $100 million. However, the adoption of OMNY on New York City Transit and the planned adoption on PATH to replace the MetroCard and SmartLink (on PATH) will mean that SmartLink will not be expanded to other transit systems, as it will be discontinued in 2023.

Future
In June 2019, the Port Authority announced it was in talks with the MTA to implement OMNY on the PATH by 2022. Under the presented plan, SmartLink would be phased out along with the MetroCard by 2023. In November 2021, the Port Authority indicated that it would instead implement its own fare payment method system, which would be similar to OMNY. Though the as-yet-unnamed fare system will accept debit and credit cards and phones for fare payment, the Port Authority did not indicate whether the fare system and OMNY would accept each other's farecards. The same month, officials awarded a $99.4 million contract to Cubic Transportation Systems for the installation of the new fare-payment system, which would replace SmartLink by 2024. The new fare payment system would be tested in a few stations in early 2023 before being installed across the network in the latter half of the year. SmartLink cards would be accepted on the new fare payment system.

See also
 Charlie Card
 Chicago Card
 Clipper card
 Octopus card
 OPUS card
 Oyster card
 SmarTrip

References

External links
 The PATH SmartLink Card

Fare collection systems in the United States
Contactless smart cards
PATH (rail system)